Abigail "Abby" Gase (born August 21, 2002) is an American Paralympic swimmer who competes in international level events.

Gase was diagnosed with transverse myelitis when she was four years old after having complications with pneumonia, her antibodies multiplied and attacked her myelin sheath on her spinal cord causing her to have no motor function in her left leg and limited mobility in her right leg.

References

2002 births
Living people
People from Maumee, Ohio
People from Bowling Green, Ohio
Paralympic swimmers of the United States
Medalists at the 2019 Parapan American Games
S7-classified Paralympic swimmers
21st-century American women